The 1973 Denver WCT, also known as the 1973 United Bank Tennis Classic for sponsorship reasons, was the second edition of the tennis event. It was held on indoor carpet courts in Denver, Colorado. The tournament was held between the April 23 and April 30, 1973. The tournament was part of the World Championship Tennis tour, and was part of the Group B circuit.  As a result the defending champions Rod Laver, of the doubles and singles, along with his doubles partner Roy Emerson, were ineligible to compete. Ninth-seeded Mark Cox won the singles title.

Finals

Singles
 Mark Cox defeated  Arthur Ashe 6–1, 6–1

Doubles
 Arthur Ashe /  Roscoe Tanner defeated  Tom Okker /  Marty Riessen 3–6, 6–3, 7–6

See also
 1973 Virginia Slims of Denver

References

External links
 ITF tournament edition details

Denver WCT
Indoor tennis tournaments
Denver WCT
Denver WCT
Denver WCT